Bình Châu may refer to several rural communes in Vietnam, including:

Bình Châu, Bà Rịa–Vũng Tàu, a commune of Xuyên Mộc District
Bình Châu, Quảng Ngãi, a commune of Bình Sơn District